Dan Hayden (born 1965) is a retired American gymnast.  Hayden was a member of the 1985 and 1987 World Championships teams.  He was a US national champion.  Hayden competed for Arizona State University and was a collegiate national champion.  In 1988, he was second at Olympic Trials during the first day of competition but fell to eighth the second day when he twice missed a Kovacs release on the high bar.  He missed selection to the team and was named an alternate.

Hayden's twin brother, Dennis, was also an elite gymnast.  The two own a gymnastics facility in Augusta, Georgia.  Both brothers were star junior athletes and moved away from home to train.

Hayden has a skill named after him on high bar:  a double layout with a full twist over the bar.  He was inducted into the USA Gymnastics Hall of Fame in 2004.

References

Living people
American gymnastics coaches
American male artistic gymnasts
Arizona State Sun Devils men's gymnasts
1965 births
20th-century American people